Cléry-Saint-André is a commune in the Loiret department in north-central France, near Orléans.

King Louis XI is buried in the Basilica of Notre Dame in the town.

See also
 Communes of the Loiret department

References

Communes of Loiret